Den may refer to:

 Den (room), a small room in a house
 Maternity den, a lair where an animal gives birth

Media and entertainment
 Den (album), 2012, by Kreidler
 Den (Battle Angel Alita), a character in the Battle Angel Alita manga series
 Den (film), a 2001 independent horror film
 Den (comics), name of 2 comic book characters
 Den Watts, or "Dirty Den", a character in the British soap opera EastEnders
 Den, a character in Thomas & Friends
 Den of thieves (film)
 Den, the Ukrainian newspaper The Day (Kyiv)

People
 Den (pharaoh), pharaoh of Egypt from 2970 BC
 Den Brotheridge (1915–1944), British Army officer
 Den Dover (born 1938), British politician
 Den Fujita (1926–2004), Japanese businessman, founder of McDonald's Japan
 Den Harrow (born 1962), stage name of Italian fashion model Stefano Zandri
 Den Hegarty (born 1954), Irish rock and roll, doo-wop and a cappella singer living in Britain

Other uses
 Den or denier (unit), a measure of the linear mass density of fibers
 Den, abbreviation for the orchid genus Dendrobium
 DEN, IATA code for Denver International Airport
 DEN, IATA code for the former Stapleton International Airport in Denver, Colorado
 A common abbreviation for the U.S. city of Denver, Colorado and its major professional sports teams:
 Denver Broncos, the city's National Football League team
 Denver Nuggets, the city's National Basketball Association team

See also
 The Den (disambiguation)
 DEN (disambiguation)
 Denn (disambiguation)
 Dens (disambiguation)
 Lair (disambiguation)